Phylloneta sisyphia, the mothercare spider, is a species of comb-footed spider from the genus Phylloneta.

Description
The female is 2.5-5.5 mm in length, males are 2.5-4.5mm.
The prosoma is reddish yellow with a broad, brown-black margin and median stripe. The sternum is reddish yellow, with a dark margin. The chelicerae are reddish yellow and the legs are also reddish yellow with brown rings. The abdomen is yellowish or reddish, with a dorsal dark brown spot pattern. Males and females are similar in colour and pattern.

Distribution
Phylloneta sisyphia has a wide Palaearctic distribution, it is widespread in western and central Europe, it is absent from Iceland. It is very similar to Phylloneta impressa and care needs to be taken in separating the two species.

Habitat
Phylloneta sisyphia is found on shrubs and bushes in sunny areas, up to an altitude of 2300 m. In Britain it is frequently found on heather and gorse bushes on open ground, but may also inhabit oak, blackthorn, nettles, juniper and thistles.

Biology
Phylloneta sisyphia builds a retreat in the shape of an inverted cup, which is covered with plant debris. Underneath the retreat the spider spins the tangle wed typical of the Theridiidae. The adults are found in the early to mid-summer, with the majority of males being found in May and June and that of females in June, but they occasionally persist into October. The single, spherical bluish-green egg-sac is produced in summer, between June and August, which is slightly earlier than Phylloneta impressa, and are retained in the retreat. The emergent juveniles are fed orally by the female, giving rise to the common name, mothercare spider. Initially the food is regurgitated by the mother but as the juveniles grow larger the mother shares larger food items with them. The female will die before the juveniles leave the nest and they will eat her body.

Subspecies
Phylloneta sisyphia foliifera (Thorell, 1875) Spain
Phylloneta sisyphia torandae (Strand, 1917) Yarkand, Karakorum

References

Theridiidae
Spiders of Europe
Palearctic spiders
Spiders described in 1757
Taxa named by Carl Alexander Clerck